East Side School may refer to:

East Side School (Thomasville, Georgia), listed on the National Register of Historic Places in Thomas County, Georgia
East Side School (Oswego, Kansas), listed on the National Register of Historic Places in Labette County, Kansas
East Side School (Laramie, Wyoming), listed on the National Register of Historic Places in Albany County, Wyoming